This is a list of singles that have appeared in the Top 10 of the Billboard Hot 100 during 1973.  There were a total of 105 singles that were in the Top 10  (97 of those peaked in 1973, four had peaked in late 1972, and four would peak in early 1974).

Stevie Wonder, Elton John, The Carpenters, Paul McCartney and Wings, Jim Croce, War, and Al Green each had three top-ten hits in 1973, tying them for the most top-ten hits during the year.

Top-ten singles

1972 peaks

1974 peaks

See also
 1973 in music
 List of Hot 100 number-one singles of 1973 (U.S.)
 Billboard Year-End Hot 100 singles of 1973

References

General sources

Joel Whitburn Presents the Billboard Hot 100 Charts: The Seventies
Additional information obtained can be verified within Billboard's online archive services and print editions of the magazine.

1973
United States Hot 100 Top 10